St. Charles Bridge may refer to:
Old St. Charles Bridge, over the Missouri River, Missouri, U.S.
St. Charles Air Line Bridge, over the Chicago River in Chicago, Illinois
St. Charles Bridge (Pueblo, Colorado), listed on the National Register of Historic Places

See also
Charles Bridge, over the Vltava river, Prague, Czech Republic